Vittaria lineata, also known by its common name shoestring fern is a species of fern from the genus Vittaria. It grows epiphytically in wet, new-world tropics and subtropics as far north as Florida.

References

Pteridaceae
Flora of Argentina
Flora of Brazil
Flora of Colombia
Flora of Mexico
Plants described in 1793
Taxa named by James Edward Smith